Elizabeth Welter Wilson (April 4, 1921 – May 9, 2015) was an American actress whose career spanned nearly 70 years, including memorable roles in film and television. In 1972 she won the Tony Award for Best Featured Actress in a Play for her role in Sticks and Bones. Wilson was inducted into the American Theater Hall of Fame in 2006.

Early life
Wilson was born in Grand Rapids, Michigan, the daughter of insurance agent Henry Dunning Wilson and Marie Ethel (née Welter) Wilson. Her maternal grandfather was a wealthy German immigrant, and Wilson was raised in a large mansion. She attended the Barter Theatre in Abingdon, Virginia, and then studied with Sanford Meisner at The Neighborhood Playhouse School of the Theatre in New York City.

According to Wilson, she was a lifelong liberal Democrat and she adhered to the Methodist faith.

Career
Wilson was a versatile character actress, appearing in over 30 movies and many Broadway plays. The Los Angeles Times noted: "Tall and elegant, Wilson often played women who had or sought authority."

Wilson made her Broadway debut in Picnic in 1953. Her stage credits include Desk Set (1955), The Good Woman of Szechuan (1970), Sticks and Bones (1972), Uncle Vanya (1973), Threepenny Opera (1976), The Importance of Being Earnest (1977), Morning's at Seven (1980), You Can't Take It with You (1983), Ah, Wilderness! (1988), and A Delicate Balance (1996).

Wilson made her screen debut reprising her stage role in the 1955 film adaptation of Picnic as Christine Schoenwalder. Additional films include Patterns (1956), The Goddess (1958), The Tunnel of Love (1958), A Child Is Waiting (1963, The Birds (1963), The Graduate (1967), Jenny (1970), Catch-22 (1970) Little Murders (1971), The Day of the Dolphin (1973), Man on a Swing (1974), The Prisoner of Second Avenue (1975), 9 to 5 (1980), Grace Quigley (1984), Regarding Henry (1991), The Addams Family (1991), and Quiz Show (1994). Her last film role was as Sara Delano Roosevelt in Hyde Park on Hudson (2012).

Wilson's television credits include early anthology series such as Kraft Television Theatre, The United States Steel Hour, and Armstrong Circle Theatre. She was a regular on the primetime drama East Side/West Side and the sitcom Doc", and she appeared in Dark Shadows, The Secret Storm, Another World, All in the Family, Murder, She Wrote, and Law & Order: Criminal Intent. She also appeared in television movies, including The Boys Next Door (1996). She appeared in the miniseries Nutcracker: Money, Madness and Murder in March 1987 as the mother of Frances Schreuder (played by Lee Remick), as well as the miniseries Alex Haley's Queen.

Death
On May 9, 2015, at age 94, Wilson died at her home in New Haven, Connecticut. She is buried at Oak Hill Cemetery in Grand Rapids, Michigan, with her parents.

Filmography

 Film 

Television

Awards and nominations
Awards
 1972 Tony Award for Best Performance by a Featured Actress in a Play for Sticks and Bones 1980 Drama Desk Award for Outstanding Ensemble Performance for Morning's at SevenNominations
 1957 BAFTA Film Award for Most Promising Newcomer for Patterns 1976 Drama Desk Award for Outstanding Actress in a Musical for Threepenny Opera 1985 Drama Desk Award for Outstanding Actress in a Play for Salonika 1987 Emmy Award for Outstanding Supporting Actress in a Miniseries or a Special for Nutcracker: Money, Madness & Murder''

References

External links

 
 
 
 Obituary, HollywoodReporter.com
 

1921 births
2015 deaths
American people of German descent
American film actresses
American stage actresses
American television actresses
Actresses from Grand Rapids, Michigan
Tony Award winners
American Academy of Dramatic Arts alumni
Neighborhood Playhouse School of the Theatre alumni
20th-century American actresses
21st-century American actresses
Grand Rapids Community College alumni
Connecticut Democrats
New York (state) Democrats
Michigan Democrats
Methodists from Michigan